Banzerkah (also Romanized as Bānzerkah and Bānzergah) is a village in Kulkani Rural District, Majin District, Darreh Shahr County, Ilam Province, Iran. At the 2006 census, its population was 180, in 35 families. The village is populated by Lurs.

References 

Populated places in Darreh Shahr County
Luri settlements in Ilam Province